Achhnera Junction railway station (station code AH) is a railway station located in Agra district in the Indian state of Uttar Pradesh. It has an average elevation of 167 metres (547 feet). It is reachable through Agra Jaipur Highway. The city is connected by rail to Agra, Jaipur, Kanpur and Mathura.

Trains 
 Marudhar Express (via Faizabad)
 Muzaffarpur–Ahmedabad Jan Sadharan Express
 Barmer–Guwahati Express
 Ghy Bme Bkn Express
 Ahmedabad–Gorakhpur Express
 Khajuraho–Udaipur City Express
 Kavi Guru Express
 Udaipur City–Kamakhya Kavi Guru Express
 Bikaner–Guwahati Express
 Agra Fort–Ajmer Intercity Express
 Udaipur City–Patliputra Humsafar Express

See also

 Northern Railway zone

References 

Railway stations in Agra district
Agra railway division